Mount Washington State Forest is a  state forest in the Mount Washington, Massachusetts. The forest conjoins with New York state and the state of Connecticut in the southern Taconic Mountains of the southwestern Berkshire region of Massachusetts. In addition to offering recreational and scenic opportunities, the forest lies adjacent to Bash Bish Falls State Park. It is managed by the Massachusetts Department of Conservation and Recreation.

History
The forest was acquired by the state through gifts of Alfred F. Intemann (1897-1986) and his wife Cornelia Van der Smissen Intemann (who died in 1963) conveyed in 1958, 1959, 1961, and 1968.

Features
The forest protects  of old growth northern hardwood forest in separate areas. The tri-state boundary stone on the Mount Frissell Trail marks Massachusett's southwest and Connecticut's northwest corners. The names of Massachusetts and New York are engraved in the stone, while Connecticut is "graffitied" on the granite.

Activities and amenities
The forest has 30 miles of trails including portions of the Appalachian Trail and the South Taconic Trail, which ascends Alander Mountain. Trails are used for hiking, horseback riding, mountain biking, and cross-country skiing. The forest also offers restrooms, picnicking, fishing, restricted hunting, and primitive wilderness camping.

References

External links 
Mount Washington State Forest Department of Conservation and Recreation
Mt. Washington State Forest Trail Map Department of Conservation and Recreation

Massachusetts state forests
State forests of the Appalachians
Old-growth forests
Taconic Mountains
Parks in Berkshire County, Massachusetts
Campgrounds in Massachusetts
Mount Washington, Massachusetts
Protected areas established in 1958
1958 establishments in Massachusetts